Chaudhry Khurram Ijaz Chattha is a Pakistani politician who was a member of the Provincial Assembly of the Punjab, from 2008 to May 2018 and from August 2018 till January 2023.

Early life and education
He was born on 10 September 1980 in Lahore to former member of the Provincial Assembly of the Punjab, Ijaz Ahmed Chattha.

He received his early education from Lawrence College, Ghora Gali. He graduated from Government College, Lahore in 2001 and obtained the degree of Master of Science in Anthropology from Quaid-i-Azam University in 2004.

Political career
He was elected to the Provincial Assembly of the Punjab as a candidate of Pakistan Muslim League (N) (PML-N) from Constituency PP-163 (Sheikhupura-II) in 2008 Pakistani general election. He received 20,505 votes and defeated a candidate of Pakistan Muslim League (Q).

He was re-elected to the Provincial Assembly of the Punjab as a candidate of PML-N from Constituency PP-163 (Sheikhupura-II) in 2013 Pakistani general election. He received 40,772 votes and defeated an independent candidate Rana Ijaz Hussain. During his second tenure as Member of the Punjab Assembly, he launched Rescue 1122 emergency service in Muridke, a fire brigade, a local trauma centre, a degree college, a school for children with special needs, a library and Degree College Of Boys & Football Ground , Munciple Commeti Office and ( Ramdan Aftaari Programm )a bus service from Muridke to some of the major universities in Lahore.

He was re-elected to the Provincial Assembly of the Punjab as a candidate of Pakistan Tehreek-e-Insaf (PTI) from Constituency PP-136 (Sheikhupura-II) in 2018 Pakistani general election. He received 52,539 votes and defeated a candidate of PML-N.

References

Living people
Punjab MPAs 2013–2018
1980 births
Lawrence College Ghora Gali alumni
Pakistan Muslim League (N) MPAs (Punjab)
Punjab MPAs 2008–2013
Punjab MPAs 2018–2023